Sigfrid Henry Steinberg (3 August 1899 – 28 January 1969) FRHS was a German scholar who emigrated to Britain where he worked as an historical author and editor.

Early life and family
Sigfrid Steinberg was born on 3 August 1899 in Goslar, Germany. He emigrated to Britain in 1936 to take up a research fellowship at The Courtauld Institute of Art in London.

Career
In Britain, Steinberg had a career as an author and editor, working for various publishing houses and producing a number of popular historical reference books.

Death
Steinberg died on 28 January 1969.

Selected publications
 A One-Year German Course. Macmillan, London, 1939.
 Historical Tables &c. Macmillan, London, 1939. (Eight editions)
 Fifteen German Poets. Macmillan, London, 1945. (Editor)
 Five Hundred Years of Printing. Faber & Faber, London, 1959.
 A New Dictionary of British History. Edward Arnold, London, 1963. (Editor)
 The Thirty Years War and the Conflict for European Hegemony 1600-1660. Edward Arnold, London, 1966. 
 Steinberg's Dictionary of British History

References

1899 births
1969 deaths
German emigrants to the United Kingdom
People from Goslar
Leipzig University alumni
Fellows of the Royal Historical Society
20th-century German historians
German editors
Historians of printing